Danilia boucheti is a species of sea snail, a marine gastropod mollusc in the family Chilodontidae.

Description
The size of the shell varies between 4 mm and 6 mm.

Distribution
This species occurs in the southwest Indian Ocean.

References

External links
 To World Register of Marine Species

boucheti
Gastropods described in 2012